Guo Hanyu (born 18 May 1998) is a Chinese tennis player.

She has won two singles titles and four doubles titles on the ITF Women's Circuit, and has reached career-high WTA rankings of 278 in singles and 122 in doubles.

Partnering Ye Qiuyu, Guo made her WTA Tour main-draw debut at the 2017 Tianjin Open, after defeating Dalila Jakupović and Nina Stojanović in qualifying.

WTA 125 tournament finals

Doubles: 2 (2 runner-ups)

ITF Circuit finals

Singles: 8 (3 titles, 5 runner–ups)

Doubles: 18 (6 titles, 12 runner–ups)

External links
 
 

1998 births
Living people
Chinese female tennis players
People from Zhengzhou
Tennis players from Henan
Universiade medalists in tennis
Universiade gold medalists for China
Medalists at the 2019 Summer Universiade
21st-century Chinese women